Ceroxyleae is a tribe of plants in the family Arecaceae.

Genera
Genera in the tribe are:

See also 
 List of Arecaceae genera

References

External links 

Monocot tribes
Ceroxyloideae